Aidan J. Larkin (born March 1946) is a former Irish nationalist politician.

Born near Cookstown, County Tyrone, Larkin studied at St Patrick's College, Armagh, University College Dublin and Queen's University Belfast.  He qualified in law and joined the Bar of Northern Ireland, but worked instead as a teacher before becoming a full-time activist in the Social Democratic and Labour Party (SDLP).

A founder member of the SDLP, Larkin was its first chairman in Magherafelt, at the 1973 Northern Ireland local elections, Larkin was elected to Magherafelt District Council, and later in the year he won a seat in Mid Ulster on the Northern Ireland Assembly.  However, he narrowly lost his seat at the Northern Ireland Constitutional Convention election in 1975, and left politics a few years later.

References

1946 births
Living people
Alumni of Queen's University Belfast
Alumni of University College Dublin
Members of Magherafelt District Council
Members of the Northern Ireland Assembly 1973–1974
People educated at St Patrick's Grammar School, Armagh
People from Magherafelt
Social Democratic and Labour Party politicians